The 1980 Avon Championships of California, also known as the Avon Championships of Oakland,  was a women's tennis tournament played on indoor carpet courts at the Oakland Coliseum  in Oakland, California in the United States that was part of the 1980 Avon Championships Circuit. It was the ninth edition of the tournament and was held from February 11 through February 17, 1980. First-seeded Martina Navratilova won the singles title, her second consecutive at the event, and earned $30,000 first-prize money.

Finals

Singles
 Martina Navratilova defeated  Evonne Goolagong Cawley 6–1, 7–6(7–4)
 It was Navratilova's 5th singles title of the year and the 39th of her career.

Doubles
 Sue Barker /  Ann Kiyomura defeated  Greer Stevens /  Virginia Wade 6–0, 6–4

Prize money

References

External links
 Women's Tennis Association (WTA) tournament edition details
 International Tennis Federation (ITF) tournament edition details

Avon Championships of California
Silicon Valley Classic
Avon Championships
Avon Championships of California
Avon Championships of California